Guerschon Yabusele (born 17 December 1995) is a French professional basketball player for Real Madrid of the Liga ACB and the EuroLeague and for the  France national team. He was considered one of the best international prospects for the 2016 NBA draft. Yabusele was drafted with the 16th overall pick by the Boston Celtics and played for them from 2017 to 2019, splitting time with Boston's G League affiliate, the Maine Red Claws. While in Boston, Yabusele became a fan favorite despite playing few minutes and was nicknamed The Dancing Bear.

Early life 
Yabusele was born and raised in Dreux, France, to parents who emigrated from the Democratic Republic of the Congo. Throughout the early portions of his life, Yabusele trained as a boxer. He began playing basketball with the youth sections of Chorale Roanne Basket in 2012, competing with their under-21 team.

Professional career 

Yabusele joined the official Roanne team of the LNB Pro B in 2013 and finished the season averaging 1.5 points per game in 8 appearances. He remained with the team for the next season, after which he averaged six points, four rebounds, and 1.7 assists. Yabusele signed with Rouen Métropole Basket of the LNB Pro A, the top league in France, in the summer of 2015. He made the decision to help his NBA draft stock. Yabusele wound up being one of 13 international underclassmen (and one of four Frenchmen) to officially enter their names for the 2016 NBA Draft. He was projected to be either a late first round or early second round selection, but surprised many by going 16th overall in the draft. Yabusele joined the Boston Celtics for the 2016 NBA Summer League.

On July 21, 2016, it was announced that Yabusele would sign a deal with the Shanghai Sharks of the Chinese Basketball Association (CBA). In 43 games for the Sharks, he averaged 20.9 points and 9.4 rebounds. Yabusele was named a CBA All-Star for the production he laid out for the Sharks.

On March 29, 2017, Yabusele signed with the Maine Red Claws of the NBA Development League.

On July 20, 2017, Yabusele signed with the Boston Celtics of the National Basketball Association. He made his debut on October 20, finishing with the statline of 3 points and 1 rebound in just 3 minutes of action in a 102–92 win against the Philadelphia 76ers. During his rookie season, he received multiple assignments to the Maine Red Claws. Yabusele's career highs all occurred during the 2017-18 season. His high in rebounds (6) came in a 111-104 win against the Chicago Bulls, his career high in assists (5) came in a 125-124 loss to the Washington Wizards, and his career high in points (16) came in a 110-97 win against the Brooklyn Nets. On July 10, 2019, Yabusele was waived by the Celtics.

On August 17, 2019, Yabusele signed with the Nanjing Monkey Kings, returning to the CBA for the 2019–20 season.

On February 25, 2020, he signed with ASVEL of the French LNB Pro A. Yabusele re-signed with the team on June 1.

On July 12, 2021, Yabusele signed a one-year contract with Spanish powerhouse Real Madrid of the Liga ACB and the EuroLeague. On January 9, 2022, Yabusele signed a three-year contract extension with Real Madrid, keeping him until the end of the 2024–2025 season.

Career statistics

NBA

Regular season

|-
| style="text-align:left;"| 
| style="text-align:left;"| Boston
| 33 || 4 || 7.1 || .426 || .324 || .682 || 1.6 || .5 || .1 || .2 || 2.4
|-
| style="text-align:left;"| 
| style="text-align:left;"| Boston
| 41 || 1 || 6.1 || .455 || .321 || .682 || 1.3 || .4 || .2 || .2 || 2.3
|- class="sortbottom"
| style="text-align:center;" colspan="2" | Career
| 74 || 5 || 7.1 || .442 || .323 || .682 || 1.4 || .4 || .2 || .2 || 2.3

Playoffs

|-
| style="text-align:left;"| 2018
| style="text-align:left;"| Boston
| 12 || 0 || 4.0 || .111 || .000 || .400 || .9 || .3 || .2 || .0 || .3
|-
| style="text-align:left;"| 2019
| style="text-align:left;"| Boston
| 4 || 0 || 3.5 || .500|| .000 || .571 || .5 || .3|| .0 || .3 || 2.0
|- class="sortbottom"
| style="text-align:center;" colspan="2"| Career
| 16 || 0 || 3.9 || .231 || .000 || .500 || .8 || .3 || .1 || .1 || .8

EuroLeague

|-
| style="text-align:left;"| 2019–20
| style="text-align:left;" rowspan=2| ASVEL
| 2 || 1 || 23.0 || .429 || .400 || .000 || 3.5 || .0 || 2.5 || 1.0 || 8.0 || 6.5
|-
| style="text-align:left;"| 2020–21
| 30 || 26 || 25.1 || .465 || .384 || .714 || 4.2 || 1.2 || .8 || .6 || 11.0 || 11.0
|-
| style="text-align:left;"| 2021–22
| style="text-align:left;"| Real Madrid
| 15 || 14 || 27.6 || .526 || .386 || .871 || 4.5 || 1.7 || 1.3 || .2 || 12.4 || 14.7
|- class="sortbottom"
| style="text-align:center;" colspan=2| Career
| 47 || 41 || 25.8 || .484 || .386 || .762 || 4.3 || 1.3 || 1.0 || .5 || 11.3 || 12.0

References

External links 

Guerschon Yabusele at DraftExpress.com
Guerschon Yabusele at Eurobasket.com
Guerschon Yabusele at EuroLeague.net
Guerschon Yabusele at NBADraft.net
Guerschon Yabusele at RealGM.com

1995 births
Living people
ASVEL Basket players
Basketball players at the 2020 Summer Olympics
Black French sportspeople
Boston Celtics draft picks
Boston Celtics players
Chorale Roanne Basket players
French expatriate basketball people in China
French expatriate basketball people in Spain
French expatriate basketball people in the United States
French men's basketball players
French sportspeople of Democratic Republic of the Congo descent
Liga ACB players
Maine Red Claws players
Medalists at the 2020 Summer Olympics
National Basketball Association players from France
Olympic basketball players of France
Olympic medalists in basketball
Olympic silver medalists for France
Sportspeople from Dreux
Power forwards (basketball)
Real Madrid Baloncesto players
Shanghai Sharks players